Psathyrotes ramosissima is a species of flowering plant in the aster family known by the common name  velvet turtleback, or turtleback. It is native to the southwestern United States where it grows in desert scrub habitat. It is a low, neatly mounded plant producing spreading stems which are hairless to densely woolly in texture. Leaves are borne on long petioles. The leaf blade is variable in shape, generally roughly rounded, and up to 2 centimeters long. It has a wavy, bluntly toothed edge and a bumpy, velvety surface coated in woolly fibers and shiny hairs. It is brownish to gray-green to very pale green in color. The knobby inflorescence is lined with woolly gray-green phyllaries with dull points that curve outward. It contains several hairy yellow disc florets. The fruit is an achene tipped with a large pappus of over 100 long, fine bristles.

References

External links

Jepson Manual Treatment
USDA Plants Profile
Photo gallery

Helenieae